Poly(ethyl acrylate) (PEA) is a family of organic polymers with the formulan. It is a synthetic acrylate polymer derived from ethyl acrylate monomer. The polymers are colorless.  This homopolymer is far less important than copolymers derived from ethyl acrylate and other monomers.  It has a low glass-transition temperature about -8°C (20°C).

Copolymers
Far more important than PMA are copolymers produced from ethyl acrylate and one or more of the following comonomers methyl methacrylate, styrene, acrylonitrile, vinyl acetate, vinyl chloride, vinylidene chloride, and butadiene.

References

Acrylate polymers